Barbora Krejčíková and Kateřina Siniaková were the defending champions from when the tournament was last held in 2019, but withdrew before the tournament began.

Gabriela Dabrowski and Luisa Stefani won the title, defeating Darija Jurak and Andreja Klepač in the final, 6–3, 6–4.

Seeds
The top four seeds received a bye into the second round.

Draw

Finals

Top half

Bottom half

References

External links
Main draw

Women's Doubles